Ram Krishna Kunwar or Ramakrishna Kunwar (IAST: Rāmakr̥ṣṇa kum̐vara) was military commander (Sardar) of Gorkha Kingdom during the Unification of Nepal at the reign of King Prithvi Narayan Shah. He was born circa 1728 AD to Ashiram Kunwar in the Kunwar family. His descendants went on to found the Rana dynasty of Nepal. He was a successful general in the unification campaign of Nepal of King Prithvi Narayan Shah. He defeated British forces at Hariharpur Gadhi on 25 August 1767. He died in Mechi Campaign in 1771 A.D.

Family

He was born to Ahiram Kunwar. He had only a son named Ranajit Kunwar and three grandsons; Bal Narsingh Kunwar, Balram Kunwar and Rewant Kunwar.

Career
King Prithvi Narayan sent Kaji Vamsharaj Pande, Naahar Singh Basnyat, Jeeva Shah, Ram Krishna Kunwar and others to defeat the forces of Gurgin Khan at Makwanpur. Ram Krishna was ordered by the King to organize the army at Makwanpur under his control. In a letter to Ramkrishna, King Prithvi Narayan Shah was unhappy at the death of Kaji Kalu Pande and thought it was impossible to conquer Kathmandu valley after the death of Kalu Pande. After the annexation of Kathmandu valley, King Prithvi Narayan Shah praised in his letter about valour and wisdom shown by Ramkrishna in annexation of Kathmandu, Lalitpur and Bhaktapur (i.e. Nepal valley at the time) on 1768-69 A.D. The letter sent by King Prithvi Narayan Shah to Ramkrishna Kunwar on Ashwin Badi 5 of unknown Vikram Year has been mentioned by historian Baburam Acharya 

The Gorkhali monarch also expresses condolence in that letter over the death of one of the brothers of Ram Krishna in the battle of Timal. Another index letter sent by King Rana Bahadur Shah to Jaya Krishna Kunwar in 1843 Vikram Samvat (i.e. 1786 A.D.) confirms that Jaya Krishna did not die in the battle of Timal which could point to the death of his youngest brother Amar Singh Kunwar in the battle of Timal. When Ram Krishna was conferred the confiscated properties (including residence) of former Kathmandu King Jaya Prakash Malla, he donated the properties to "Guthi" for supplying foods to pilgrims in Shivaratri festival. King Prithvi Narayan Shah had deployed Sardar Ram Krishna to the invasion of Kirant regional areas comprising; Pallo Kirant (Limbuwan), Wallo Kirant and Majh Kirant (Khambuwan). In 13th of Bhadra 1829 Vikram Samvat (i.e. 29 August 1772), Ram Krishna crossed Dudhkoshi river to invade King Karna Sen of. Majh Kirant (Khambuwan) and Saptari region with fellow commander Abhiman Singh Basnyat. He crossed Arun River to reach Chainpur(Limbuwan). Later, he achieved victory over Kirant region. King Prithvi Narayan Shah bestowed 22 pairs of Shirpau (special headgear) in appreciation to Ram Krishna Kunwar after his victory over the Kirant region. Genealogist Daniel Wright contends that Ram Krishna died at Pyuthan at the age of 59.

Rana dynasty
His descendants later went on to become Rana dynasty of Nepal.

See also
Bir Bhadra Thapa
Shivaram Singh Basnyat

References

Footnotes

Notes

Books
 

1728 births
1771 deaths
Nepalese generals
People of the Nepalese unification
Nepalese military personnel killed in action
18th-century Nepalese nobility
Khas people